Jeremy S. Tomuli (born 13 October 1971 in Auckland) is a New Zealand-born Samoan rugby union player. He plays as a prop. He played for FC Oloron until 2016, when he started to play for Escou.

Career
His first international cap was against Ireland, at Lansdowne Road, on 11 November 2001. He was also part of the 2003 Rugby World Cup roster, where he played 4 matches for Samoa in the tournament. His last cap was against Japan, at New Plymouth, on 17 June 2008. In his international career he earned 14 caps and 0 points in aggregate.

Notes

External links

Jeremy S. Tomuli at New Zealand Rugby History

1971 births
Living people
Rugby union players from Auckland
Samoan rugby union players
Samoan expatriate sportspeople in France
New Zealand expatriate sportspeople in France
Samoan people of New Zealand descent
Rugby union props
Samoa international rugby union players
Expatriate rugby union players in France
New Zealand expatriate rugby union players
Samoan expatriate rugby union players
New Zealand rugby union players
Section Paloise players
SU Agen Lot-et-Garonne players
Aviron Bayonnais players
US Colomiers players
Counties Manukau rugby union players